Oka Pellam Muddu Rendo Pellam Vaddu ( One wife is enough, don't have a second one) is 2004 Telugu-language comedy film produced by Dammalapati Srinivasa Rao on Sai Krishna Productions banner and directed by Kongarapi Venkata Ramana. It stars Rajendra Prasad, Raasi and Gurleen Chopra , with music composed by Vandemataram Srinivas. The film was recorded as a flop at the box office.

Plot
Harischandra (Rajendra Prasad) is a very loyal and truthful middle-class person, but his wife Satya (Raasi) creates a separate world, feeling herself as rich and wealthy. They have a kid. Once Satya's brother Sarath (Surya) visits their house and in the talk he promises a bounty of Rs. 1 crore to the couple if they give birth to a girl and she marries his son after growing up. Satya approaches a renowned Swamiji and seeks his blessings for the baby girl; he advises her that they should start a vow of telling lies to everybody, first Hari doesn't agree to it, but as Satya tries to commit suicide he also agrees for the vow. As the situation had it, Hari has to meet his childhood friend Krishna (Krishna Bhagawan) due to the vow, he lies that he has not married, so Krishna arranges his sister Meena's (Gurlin Chopra) marriage with Hari. Due to Meena's father being in his last stage, the situation lands up that Hari has to suddenly marry Meena. He brings Meena to the house and introduces Satya as a servant. The remaining story is how Hari manages between two wives.

Cast

Rajendra Prasad as Hari Chandra
Raasi as Satya
Gurleen Chopra as Meena
Brahmanandam
Sunil
Tanikella Bharani as Sarvarayudu
Venu Madhav
Krishna Bhagawan as Krishna
Surya as Sarath
Rama Prabha
Jayalalita
Radhika Chowdary
Junior Relangi
Jeeva
Jenny

Soundtrack

Music was composed by Vandemataram Srinivas. Music was released on Supreme Music Company.

References

2000s Telugu-language films
Indian comedy films
2004 comedy films
2004 films